Sir Robert Shore Milnes, 1st Baronet (1754 – 2 December 1837) was Lieutenant Governor of Lower Canada from 1799 to 1805. Milnes served in the Royal Horse Guards and retired as Captain in 1788.

He married Charlotte Frances Bentinck, daughter of Captain John Bentinck and Renira van Tuyll van Serooskerken, on 12 November 1785. Milnes died at Tunbridge Wells, England.

References
Biography at the Dictionary of Canadian Biography Online

External links 
 Archives of Sir Robert Shore Milnes (Robert Shore Milnes collection, R2453) are held at Library and Archives Canada

1754 births
1837 deaths
Royal Horse Guards officers
Governors of British North America
Deputy Lieutenants of the West Riding of Yorkshire
Baronets in the Baronetage of the United Kingdom
British Governors of Martinique